The Nostalgia of the Infinite is a painting by Italian metaphysical painter Giorgio de Chirico, painted in the early 1910s.

The subject of the painting is a large tower. The scene is struck by low, angular evening light. In the foreground below the tower are two small shadowy figures resembling those in future works by Salvador Dalí. This painting is the most famous example of the tower theme which appears in several of Chirico's works.

Although the painting is dated 1911, this date is generally held in question. It has been speculated by the Museum of Modern Art in New York City that it was created from 1912 to 1913, while the Annenberg School for Communication suggests 1913–14. According to art historian Robert Hughes, the painting draws inspiration from the Mole Antonelliana in Turin, Italy.

Legacy
This painting, amongst other works by Giorgio de Chirico, influenced the painting by Fumito Ueda used for the front cover of the Japanese and European versions of the video game Ico.

References

External links
 The Nostalgia of the Infinite on the Museum of Modern Art

1910s paintings
Architecture paintings
Paintings by Giorgio de Chirico
Paintings in the collection of the Museum of Modern Art (New York City)